Irina "Ira" Risenzon-Nahmany ( Risenzon, ; born 14 January 1988) is a retired Hungarian-born Israeli rhythmic gymnast. She is the 2008 Grand Prix Final all-around bronze medalist.

Early and personal life
Irina Risenzon was born in Hungary, then her parents along with her older brother Yuri and she moved to Ukraine, and then they immigrated to Israel when she was 9 year olds. They resided in Hadera, Israel.

In 2011 she went through a conversion to Judaism.

She married Dave Nahmany on 18 July 2011, and they have 2 daughters, and reside in Hod HaSharon, Israel.

Career 

Risenzon is coached by Ira Vigdorchik of Maccabi Holon.

Risenzon had her highest placement at the 2009 World Championships held in Mie, Japan finishing 6th in All-around and at the 2008 European Championships in Torino, Italy finishing 8th in All-around. She competed on behalf of Israel at the 2008 Summer Olympics in Beijing, China, placing 9th in the individual all-around competition. She won the All-around bronze medal at the 2008 Grand Prix Final in Bratislava, Slovakia.

In 2009, Risenzon won silver medals in the individual hoop event at the Summer Universiade. She has also won a pair of bronze medals at the individual apparatus events in ribbon, rope, ball, hoop and clubs at the FIG World Cup and Grand Prix Series.

Risenzon ended her career in 2010.

Achievements 
 first Israeli to advance to the Olympics Final finishing 9th in All-around
 first Israeli to medal at the Grand Prix Final

Detailed Olympic results

See also
 Sports in Israel

References

External links
 

1988 births
Living people
Gymnasts at the 2008 Summer Olympics
Olympic gymnasts of Israel
People from Budapest
People from Hadera
Israeli rhythmic gymnasts
Universiade medalists in gymnastics
Universiade silver medalists for Israel
Medalists at the 2009 Summer Universiade
Hungarian emigrants to Israel
Ukrainian emigrants to Israel
Israeli people of Hungarian descent
Israeli people of Ukrainian descent
Converts to Judaism
Israeli Jews
Jewish gymnasts